Pyotr Alexeyevich Bessonov or (in the pre-1917 spelling) Bezsonov (Пётр Алексе́евич Бессо́нов; 1828–1898) was a leading Russian folklorist who collected and published many East Slavic and South Slavic folk songs.

The son of a priest, Bessonov was born in Moscow. He graduated at Moscow University in 1851.  After five years of graduate work in ancient and modern languages, he earned the government printing commission.  From 1864 to 1867 he was supervisor of the Vilna Museum and Public Library, besides serving as director of education in the same city.  For the two following years he was librarian at Moscow University.

Having received an honorary doctor's diploma in Slavonic philology from Kazan University, he became professor of Slavic languages  at the University of Kharkov in 1879, remaining in the position till his death.  He published:
 Bolgarskiya Pyesni (1855), the first great collection of Bulgarian folk songs; 
 a collection of Serbian folk songs, under the title Lazarica (1857); 
 Pyotr Kireevsky's collections of Russian songs (1861–71); 
 a number of treatises on the Bulgarian, Serbian, and Russian languages and literatures.

References

Bibliography
 

1828 births
1898 deaths
Writers from Moscow
People from Moskovsky Uyezd
Philologists from the Russian Empire
Folklorists from the Russian Empire
Librarians from the Russian Empire
Imperial Moscow University alumni
Academic staff of the National University of Kharkiv